Reggie Holmes (born August 8, 1987) is an American professional basketball player who last played for Kymis of the Greek Basket League. A  shooting guard, he is best known for his college career, where he was an All-American and Mid-Eastern Athletic Conference Player of the Year at Morgan State University.

College career
Holmes came to Morgan State from Southern High School and St. Frances Academy, both in Baltimore, Maryland.  He played there from 2006 to 2010, leaving as the school's all-time leading scorer with 2,049 points.  As a junior, Holmes scored 20 points in the 2009 MEAC men's basketball tournament MEAC tournament final and was named tournament Most Valuable Player, leading the Bears to their first Division I NCAA tournament appearance.  As a senior, Holmes again helped the Bears to a MEAC championship and an NCAA tournament bid.  For the season, he averaged 21.4 points per game and at the close of the season was named conference Player of the Year and an honorable mention All-American by the Associated Press.

Playing career
Following the close of his NCAA career, Holmes signed with AS Salé, later moving to the Erie BayHawks of the NBA Development League.  He would also play in Poland and Bulgaria. On November 20, 2018, he joined Kymis of the Greek Basket League, but left the team a month later.

In 2018, Holmes played with Egyptian club Al Ahly in the 2018–19 FIBA Africa Basketball League, where he led the league in scoring.

References

External links
 Morgan State profile
 Eurobasket.com profile
 FIBA.com profile

1987 births
Living people
American expatriate basketball people in Bulgaria
American expatriate basketball people in France
American expatriate basketball people in Greece
American expatriate basketball people in Lebanon
American expatriate basketball people in Morocco
American expatriate basketball people in Poland
American expatriate basketball people in Turkey
American men's basketball players
Basket Brescia Leonessa players
Basketball players from Baltimore
BC Beroe players
Erie BayHawks (2008–2017) players
Halcones de Ciudad Obregón players
Kymis B.C. players
Le Mans Sarthe Basket players
Morgan State Bears men's basketball players
Shooting guards
SKK Kotwica Kołobrzeg players
AS Salé (basketball) players
Beirut Club players